The Dullahan (Irish: Dubhlachan ; dúlachán), also called Gan Ceann (meaning "without a head" in Irish), is a type of mythological creature in Irish folklore.  He is depicted as a headless rider, on a black horse, who carries his own head held high in his hand or under his arm.

Terminology
Dullahan or Dulachan ( [Duḃlaċan]) referring to "hobgoblin" (generic term; cf. Dullahan described as "unseelie (wicked) fairy"), literally "signifies dark, sullen person", according to the lexicographer Edward O'Reilly, apparently containing the stem dubh meaning "black" in Irish. Dulachan and Durrachan are alternative words for this "hobgoblin", and these forms suggest etymological descent from  "anger" or  "malicious" or "fierce". 

Dullahan was later glossed as "dark, angry, sullen, fierce or malicious being" encompassing  both etymologies, though Thomas Crofton Croker considered the alternative etymology more dubious than the dubh "black" ("dark") etymology.

The Irish name Ó Duibhleacháin is cognate with "Dullahan", according to certain researchers of Irish names.

Legends
Croker's Fairy Legends and Traditions of the South of Ireland (1828) contained a section on "The Dullahan" with five chapters, devoted to the lore of headless beings, followed by his own commentary.

A dullahan is the general term for the headless evil spirit.

He may be depicted as a Headless Horseman, stereotypically on a black horse, who carries his own head held high in his hand, or under his arm.

There are also legends and tales concerning the "Headless Coach" (also called "Coach-a-bower"), with its presumed driver being the Dullahan.

The rumour of a Dullahan's appearance often develops near a graveyard or a charnel vault where a wicked aristocrat is reputed to be buried.

Headless Coachman 
A dullahan is not always a mounted horseman, but may also appear as a headless coachman who drives the horse-drawn carriage out of graveyards, or conversely, arrives driving the Death Coach at the doorstep of a person whose death is nigh approaching.

"Headless Coach" or the "Soundless Coach" (literally "deaf coach", ; Hiberno-English: Coshta Bower, corrupted to "coach-a-bower")  is the name given to the said vehicle driven by the dullahan.

In the story "Hanlon's Mill", Michael (Mick) Noonan was walking back from his trip to a shoemaker at Ballyduff, Co. Cork, and passed the ruined mill of "Old Hanlon", which seemed to be issuing clacking noises as if it were in operation. He then met his neighbour Darby who asked him to take the car and horse back, and came upon the River Awbeg, continuing from open road to the road flanked by wooded areas. He noticed that the moon reflected on the pool of water disappear, and when he turned, he saw, proceeding beside his cart, a black coach drawn by six headless black horses, driven by a headless coachman clad in black. The next morning, Mick received news from the huntsman that Master Wrixon of Ballygibblin had a fit, and died. Croker in connection to this story remarks that the appearance of "Headless Coach" foreshadows imminent death, or misfortune.

Croker reports one legend that a Headless Coach would run back and forth from Castle Hyde to a glen/valley beyond the village of Ballyhooly, in County Cork. Nearby in the town of Doneraile, it was said that the coach would visit the houses in succession, and whichever occupant dared to open the door would be splashed with a basin (basin-ful) of blood by the coachman. At any rate, the coach making a stop is a death omen, or ill omen for the "departing soul".

Soundless Coach

Cóiste Bodhar was referred to as "Soundless Coach" by Robert Lynd, who gave an account of a "silent shadow" of a coach passing by, provided by an avowed witness from Connemara. However William Butler Yeats  explained that "the 'deaf coach' was so called because of its rumbling sound".

According to one witness, only the silent shadow of the horse-drawn hearse, i.e, the "Soundless Coach" was seen passing by.

Males and females 

The tale "The Good Woman" an encounter with cloaked female figure, who turned out to be a headless Dullahan. Later, he encounters many, both males and females.

It happened to a resident of "White Knight's Country" at the foot the Galtee Mountains (Galtymore), a peasant named Larry Dodd, who was also the most skilled horse-breaker around. He traveled (westward) to Cashel where he bought a nag, intending to sell it at Kildorrery fair that June evening. He offered a ride to a cloaked female, stopping at "Kilnaslattery Church" to mend his shoe. When he grabbed her to exact a kiss as payment in kind for the ride, he discovered her to be a Dullahan. After losing grip of consciousness, he found that in the church ruins was a wheel of torture set with severed heads (skulls), and all around headless Dullahans, both men and women, nobles and commoners of various occupations. Larry was offered a drink, which caused his head to be severed in mid-sentence as he was about to compliment it, though his head reverted when he regained his senses. He also seemed to have lost his horse to the Dullahans.

Bone-crafted objects 

The Dullahan has been ascribed with using the spine of a human corpse for a whip by a number of modern commentators.

The headless coachman merely bears a "long whip" in Croker's tale "The Harvest Dinner", with which he lashed the horses so furiously he almost struck a witness blind in an eye (the would-be-victim regarded it as deliberate assault). Croker deduces that the headless one as a way of habit always uses the long whip as weapon to destroy his witness's eye or eyes, reasoning that the coachman's wrath turns to the onlooker because he himself lack the ability to look, due to his headlessness.

The spine is mentioned in conjunction with the phantom coach by Croker in his poem "The Death Coach", but the lines "The spokes are the dead men's thigh bones,/And the pole is the spine of the back" presumably refer to these bones being used on the axle and the wheel-spokes of the carriage. A later writer prosifying this description supplied additional details, so that the "two hollow skulls" used as lanterns on the carriage  are set with candles, and the hammercloth made of pall material "mildew'd by damps" is embellished as being chewed away by worms.

Severed head 

The Dullahan may be a headless body, or may carry his (severed) head, which he may carry under his (right) arm, as in Croker's tale "The Headless Horseman": 

..such a head no mortal ever saw before. It looked like a large cream cheese hung round with black puddings: no speck of colour enlivened the ashy paleness of the depressed features; the skin lay stretched over the unearthly surface almost like the parchment head of a drum. Two fiery eyes of prodigious circumference, with a strange and irregular motion, flashed like meteors..

In the words of the modern storyteller Tony Locke of County Mayo, Dullahan's mouth, full of razor-sharp teeth, forms a grin reaching the sides of the head, its "massive" eyes "constantly dart about like flies", and the flesh has acquired the "smell, colour and consistency of mouldy cheese". A modern commentator also explicitly states that the Dullahan has the ability to see with the severed head, i.e., "use it to scan the countryside for mortals about to die".

In contrast, the headless coach in the tale "The Harvest Dinner" described above is described "blind (thief)", and Croker assumes he lacks the sense of sight, as is mentioned above.

Miscellanea

Some believe the Dullahan to be the embodied spirit of the Celtic god Crom Dubh.

There are rumours that golden objects can force the Dullahan to disappear.

In popular culture
 The fantasy film Darby O'Gill and the Little People features a Dullahan who drives the Death Coach. When it arrives, it calls out Darby's name in place of his daughter and he enters the coach, though he is saved by the king of the leprechauns.
 Dullahan is a common name for headless warriors - predominantly knights - in Japanese video games and anime. The influence from this has resulted in Japanese young adult media commonly portraying "Dullahans" with traits not associated with the original Irish folklore, such as wearing plate armour.
 In the anime Durarara!!, one of the main characters, Celty Sturluson is a Dullahan that came to Japan from Ireland in search of her stolen head.
 Irish author Derek Landy's work draws from Irish folklore. The novel Skulduggery Pleasant: Mortal Coil features a Dullahan who drives the Coach-a-Bowers, which is pulled by four headless horses, and is summoned to collect any human who has heard the call of a banshee.
In The Misadventures of Myndil Plodostirr by author Michelle Franklin, Mr Dullahan, who was named by Myndil, is a dullahan that lost its horse and whip and now protects an abbey in Ulaid.

See also

 Cephalophore
 Headless Rider (Urban Legend)

Explanatory notes

References
Citations

Bibliography

External links

 The Dullahan Legend at Scary For Kids.
 Dullahan Website
 

Fairies
Fantasy creatures
Irish folklore
Irish legendary creatures
Irish demons
Irish ghosts
Tuatha Dé Danann